The Navy Enlisted Classification (NEC) system supplements the rating designators for enlisted members of the United States Navy. A naval rating and NEC designator are similar to the Military Occupational Specialty (MOS) designators used in the U.S. Army and U.S. Marine Corps and the Air Force Specialty Code (AFSC) used in the U.S. Air Force.

The U.S. Navy has several ratings or job specialties for its enlisted members. An enlisted member is known by the enlisted rating, for example, a Machinist's Mate (or MM or by the enlisted rate, for example Petty Officer First Class (or PO1). Often Navy enlisted members are addressed by a combination of rating and rate. In this example, this machinist's mate petty officer first class may be addressed as Machinist's Mate 1st Class (or MM1).

However, the NEC designator is a four-digit code that identifies skills and abilities beyond the standard (or outward) rating designator. According to the Military Personnel Manual (MILSPERMAN) 1221-010, the NEC designator facilitates personnel planning, procurement, and selection for training; development of training requirements; promotion, distribution, assignment and the orderly call to active duty of inactive duty personnel in times of national emergency or mobilization.

For example, a person holding the MM-3385 is a nuclear-trained machinist's mate for surface ships, and a person with an MM-3355 is a nuclear-trained machinist's mate for submarines.

In the U.S. Navy's officer ranks, the naval officer designator serves a similar purpose.

01  Deck Department 

0160 - Causeway Barge Ferry Pilot    PO2-MCPO

0161 - YTB/YT Tugmaster   PO1-MCPO

0164 - Patrol Boat Coxswain   SN-PO1

0167 - LCAC Operator   CPO-MCPO

0169 - Causeway Barge Ferry Coxswain   PO3-PO1

0170 - Surface Rescue Swimmer   SN-MCPO

0171 - Landing Craft Utility Craftmaster   PO1-MCPO

0172 - LCAC Loadmaster   SN-PO1

0181 - Navy Lighterage Deck Supervisor  PO3-PO1

0190 - Force Protection Boat Coxswain   PO3-PO1

0199 - Boatswain's Mate Basic

02   Navigation Department 

0202 - Assistant Navigator   PO1-MCPO

0215 - Harbor/Docking Pilot   PO1-MCPO

0299 - Quartermaster Basic

03   Operations Department 

0302 - AN/SYS-2 Integrated Automatic Detection and Tracking (IADT) Systems Operator   SN-CPO

0304 - LCAC Radar Operator/Navigator   PO2-CPO

0318 - Air Intercept Controller   PO2-PO1

0319 - Supervisory Air Intercept Controller   PO1-MCPO

0324 - ASW/SUW Tactical Air Controller (ASTAC)  PO2-MCPO

0327 - Sea Combat Air Controller (SCAC)   SN-CPO

0328 - ASW/ASUW Tactical Air Control (ASTAC) Leadership   CPO-MCPO

0334 - HARPOON (AN/SWG-1A) Engagement Planning Operator   PO3-MCPO

0336 - Tactical/Mobile (TacMobile) Operations Control (OPCON) Operator   SN-CPO

0340 - Global Command and Control System Common Operational Picture/Maritime 4.X (GCCS COP/M 4.X) Operator   SN-MCPO

0342 - Global Command and Control System Common Operational Picture/Maritime (GCCS COP/M) Operator   SN-MCPO

0345 - Joint Tactical Ground Station (JTAGS)/Multi-Mission Mobile Processor (M3P) System Operator/Maintainer  PO3-CPO

0346 - AEGIS Console Operator Track 3   SN-MCPo

0347 - Ship Self Defense System (SSDS) MK1 Operator   SN-PO1

0348 - Multi-Tactical Digital Information Link Operator (TADIL)   PO3-MCPO

0349 - SSDS MK 2 Advanced Operator   SN-CPO  

0350 - Interface Control Officer (ICO)   PO1-MCPO

0356 - Global Command and Control System-Maritime (4.1) Increment 2 (GCCS-M 4.1 Inc 2) Operator   SR-MCPO

0399 - Operations Specialist Basic

1523 - AN/SPN-35 Amphibious Air Traffic Control Radar Technician

04   Sonar Technician (Submarine/Surface) 

0402 - AN/SQQ-89(V)2/9 Active Sonar Level II Technician/Operator   Petty Officer -Chief

0410 - AN/SLQ-48(V) Mine Neutralization Systems (MNS) Operator/Maintenance Technician   SN-MCPO

0411 - AN/SQQ-89(V)4/6 Sonar Subsystem Level I Operator   SN-PO1

0414 - AN/SQQ-89(V)3/5 Active Sonar Level II Technician/Operator  PO3-SCPO

0415 - AN/SQQ-89(V) 2/3/4/6/7/8/9/12 Passive Sonar Level II Technician/Operator   PO3-SCPO

0416 - Acoustic Intelligence Specialist   PO1-MCPO

0417 - ASW Specialist   CPO-MCPO

0425 - AN/BQQ-6 TRIDENT LEVEL III Master Operation and Maintenance Technician   PO2-MCPO

0430 - Underwater Fire Control System MK-116 MOD 7 Anti-Submarine Warfare Control System Operator   PO2-MCPO

0450 - Journeyman Level Acoustic Analyst   PO2-MCPO

0455 - AN/SQQ-89(V) 4/6 Active Sonar Level II Technician   PO3-SCPO

0461 - AN/BSY-2(V) Advanced Maintainer   PO3-MCPO

0466 - Journeyman Surface Ship USW Supervisor PO2-SCPO

0501 - Sonar (Submarines) Leading Chief Petty Officer   PO1-MCPO

0505 - Integrated Undersea Surveillance System (IUSS) Analyst   SN-SCPO

0506 - Integrated Undersea Surveillance System (IUSS) Maintenance Technician  SN-SCPO

0507 - Integrated Undersea Surveillance System (IUSS) Master Analyst   PO2-SCPO

0509 - AN/SQQ-89 (V) Adjunct Subsystem Level II Technician   PO3-SCPO

0510 - AN/SQS-53D Sensor Subsystem Level II Technician/Operator   SSN-CPO

0511 - AN/SQQ-89(V) 11/12 Sonar Subsystem Level I Operator   SN-PO1

0512 - AN/BSY-1 and AN/BQQ-5E Combined Retained Equipment Maintenance Technician   PO3-SCPO

0518 - Sonar Technician AN/BQQ-10(V) Operator/Maintainer   PO3-SCPO

0520 - Sonar, Combat Control and Architecture Equipment Technician   PO2-SCPO

0521 - AN/SQQ-89(V)15 Sonar System Level I Operator   SN-PO1

0522 - AN/SQQ-89(V)15 Sonar System Level II Technician PO3-MCPO

0523 - AN/SQQ-89(V)15 Sonar System Journeyman PO2-SCPO

0524 - AN/SQQ-89A(V)15/(V)15 EC204 Surface Ship USW Combat Systems Senor Operator  SN-PO1

0525 - AN/SQQ-89A(V)15 Surface Ship USW Combat Systems Maintenance Technician   PO3-SCPO

0527 - AN/SQQ-89A(V)15/(V)15 EC204 Surface Ship USW Combat Systems Journeyman   PO2-CPO

0530 - AN/BQQ-10(V) TI-10/12 Operator/Maintainer   PO3-SCPO

0540 - AN/SQQ-34C (V) 2 Aircraft Carrier Tactical Support Center (CV-TSC) Operator   PO3-SCPO

0541 - AN/SQQ-34C (V) 2 Aircraft Carrier Tactical Support Center (CV-TSC) Maintenance Technicians   PO3-PO1

0550 - Integrated Undersea Surveillance System (IUSS) Passive Sensor Operator (PSO)   SN-SCPO

0551 - Integrated Undersea Surveillance System (IUSS) Supervisor  PO2-SCPO

0552 - Integrated Undersea Surveillance System (IUSS) Low Frequency Active (LFA)/Compact Low Frequency Active (CLFA) Operator   SN-SCPO

0553 - Integrated Undersea Surveillance System (IUSS) SURTASS Mission Commander   CPO-MCPO

08  Weapons Department 

0746 - Advanced Undersea MK-46 Maintenance Weapons Smith  (SN-SCPO)

0812 - Small Arms Marksmanship Instructor   (PO2-MCPO)

0814 - Crew Served Weapons (CSW) Instructor   (PO2-MCPO)

0857 - 25mm Machine Gun System (MGS) MK 38 MOD Gun Weapon System (GWS) Technician   (SN-PO1)

0870 - MK 46 MOD 2 Gun Weapon System (GWS) Technician   (SN-SCPO)

0878 - MK-75 Operator/Maintainer   (SN-CPO)

0879 - 5"/54 Caliber Gun System MK-45 MOD 1 and 2 Operator/Maintainer   (SN-SCPO)

0880 - 5”/62-Caliber MK 45 MOD 4 Gun Mount Maintenance   (SN-SCPO)

0979 - MK-41 VLS Baseline IV Through VII Technician  (SN-MCPO)

0981 - MK-41 VLS Maintainer Technician   (SN-MCPO)

References 
NAVPERS 18068F Volume II the official manual of Navy Enlisted Classifications (NECs) published in BUPERS.  April 2021

 
United States Navy